Pieter Otto ("Peter") Schep (born 8 March 1977 in Lopik, Utrecht) is a Dutch racing cyclist, specializing in track cycling endurance events.

Biography
Born in Lopik, Schep represented the Netherlands at the 1996, 2000 and 2004 Summer Olympics. In all three occasions he took part in the team pursuit. In 1996 he featured in a team with Jarich Bakker, Richard Rozendaal and Robert Slippens and finished in 12th position. A new team with Slippens, John den Braber, Jens Mouris and Wilco Zuijderwijk was created with success. The team improved their 2000 effort and reached the quarter finals where they were lapped by the team from the Ukraine, resulting in a seventh place overall. Schep and Mouris also qualified for the same discipline in 2004, but this time they were joined by Levi Heimans and Jeroen Straathof. Yet again the previous effort was improved when the team finished fifth.

Palmarès 

2000
3rd Pursuit, Dutch National Track Championships
1st Stage 6, Olympia's Tour
2001
3rd Pursuit, Dutch National Track Championships
2003
1st  Scratch, Dutch National Track Championships
3rd Madison, Dutch National Track Championships
3rd Points race, Dutch National Track Championships
1st Stage 3, OZ Wielerweekend
2004
1st  Points race, Dutch National Track Championships
1st Stage 3, Ronde van Antwerpen
2005
2nd Points race, UCI Track World Championships
1st Classic 2000 Borculo
1st Points Race in Moscow (World Cup)
2nd Scratch, Dutch National Track Championships
2006
1st  Points race, UCI Track World Championships
1st 6-Days of Amsterdam
1st Omloop van de Glazen Stad
1st Parel van de Veluwe
1st Omloop Schokland
2nd Madison, European Track Championships
2007
1st  Madison, European Track Championships (together with Jens Mouris)
1st Madison in Manchester (World Cup)
1st Stage 2, Ronde van Midden-Brabant
2nd Points Race, UCI Track World Championships
2nd Madison, 2007 Dutch National Track Championships (together with Jens Mouris)
2008
3rd Points race, UCI Track World Championships
2nd Points race, 2008 Dutch National Track Championships
1st  Madison, 2008 Dutch National Track Championships (together with Wim Stroetinga)
2009
2nd Points race, 2009 Dutch National Track Championships
2010
1st  Scratch, 2010 Dutch National Track Championships
1st  Madison, 2010 Dutch National Track Championships (together with Theo Bos)
2011
3rd Madison, 2011 Dutch National Track Championships (together with Wim Stroetinga)

See also
 List of Dutch Olympic cyclists

External links

Schep at the Dutch Olympic Archive

1977 births
Living people
Cyclists at the 1996 Summer Olympics
Cyclists at the 2000 Summer Olympics
Cyclists at the 2004 Summer Olympics
Cyclists at the 2008 Summer Olympics
Dutch male cyclists
Olympic cyclists of the Netherlands
People from Lopik
UCI Track Cycling World Champions (men)
Dutch cyclists at the UCI Track Cycling World Championships
Cyclists from Utrecht (province)